Timothy Jerome (born December 29, 1943, Los Angeles, California) is an American stage, film, and television actor.

Biography 
After attending Cornell University, Ithaca College (BFA) and the Manhattan School of Music (Master of Music), Jerome made his Broadway debut in 1969 as Dr. Carrasco in “Man of La Mancha”.  He has subsequently appeared in more than a dozen productions on Broadway, including as Monsieur Firmin in “The Phantom of the Opera”.

Jerome was nominated for the 1987 Tony Award as Best Actor (Featured Role – Musical) for Me and My Girl. As Alfred P. Doolittle in the 2007–2008 national tour of My Fair Lady he received the Carbonell Award and was nominated for the Helen Hayes Award.  He received a Special Award from the New England Theatre Conference in 2008 for Outstanding Achievement in the American Theatre.

The Founding President of the National Music Theater Network (the parent organization of the New York Musical Festival, NYMF), Jerome is also the Founding President of Mainstreet Musicals, a non-profit organization that facilitates the development of new musicals. A past board member of the Screen Actors Guild (SAG) and former 1st Vice President of The American Guild of Musical Artists (AGMA), Jerome has also served as a Councilor of the Actors’ Equity Association.

Appearances

Broadway 
Phantom of the Opera (M. Firmin)
The Lyons (Ben Lyons - understudy)
Tarzan (Professor Porter)
Baz Luhrmann’s La Bohème (Alcindoro, Benoit)
Beauty and the Beast (Maurice)
Lost in Yonkers (Eddie)
Grand Hotel (Preysing)
Me and My Girl (Herbert Parchester)
Cats (Bustopher Jones, Asparagus, Growltiger)
The Moony Shapiro Songbook (Moony Shapiro)
Arthur Miller's Creation of the World and Other Business
The Magic Show
The Rothschilds (Amshel Rothschild; Nathan Rothschild)
Man of La Mancha (Dr. Carrasco)

Off-Broadway 
Dracula (Little Shubert Theater)
Flamingo Court (New World Stages)

Regional 
Arena Stage (Washington, DC) 
Goodspeed Musicals (Chester, CT)
George Street Playhouse (New Brunswick, NJ) 
McCarter Theatre (Princeton, NJ)
North Shore Music Theatre (Beverly, MA)
Phoenix Theatre (Purchase, NY)

Film 
 Getting Wasted (1980) - Mr. Graham
 Compromising Positions (1985) - Rabbi
Betrayed (1988) - Jud / Bartender
Billy Bathgate (1991) - Dixie Davis
Husbands and Wives (1992) - Paul
I.Q. (1994) - Academic
Everyone Says I Love You (1996) - X-Ray Room Doctor
Deconstructing Harry (1997) - Director
A Price Above Rubies (1998) - Dr. Bauer
Mixing Nia (1998) - Harvey
Celebrity (1998) - Hotel Clerk
Cradle Will Rock (1999) - Maxine Elliot's - Bert Weston
Thirteen Days (2000) - Journalist
Sidewalks of New York (2001) - Dr. Lance
Spider-Man 2 (2004) - Injured Scientist
The Third Testament (2010) - Dr. Dorian Ness

Television 
Barney Miller (1977) - Harold Sanders
Lou Grant (1977) - Murray
The Tony Randall Show (1978) - Carlson Jr.
Laverne & Shirley (1978) - Dr. Schoenbroom
The Days and Nights of Molly Dodd (1991) - Steven Sauer
Law & Order (2004) - Sam Laval
Third Watch (2005) - Peter Lynch
Person of Interest (2011)
Wizard of Lies (2017, TV Movie, HBO) - Burt Ross

References

External links 
http://www.thephantomoftheopera.com/new-york-people/cast/tim-jerome
http://www.broadwayworld.com/people/TimJerome
http://ibdb.com/person.php?id=492598
http://www.imdb.com/name/nm0422040/?ref_=fn_al_nm_2
http://mainstreetmusicals.org

1943 births
Living people
American male stage actors
American male film actors
American male television actors